Loretta Lucero Alvarez (nicknamed Mama and Nana; 1892 – 30 December 1996) was a Pascua Yaqui midwife from the 1920s until the 1970s in Tucson, Arizona. Tucson's Kino Community Hospital named their labor and delivery unit after her.

Personal life
Loretta Lucero was born in northern Mexico in 1892. She married Luis Alvarez, a railroad worker, and moved to Nogales, Arizona. After World War I, the couple moved to Tucson, where they raised their 14 children.

Midwifery
Nicknamed "Mama" by family and locals alike, she spoke both Yaqui and Spanish and provided her services to women from different ethnic groups, as well as her own Pascua Yaqui community. In her midwife work she utilized herbs and prenatal massage to deliver breech births. Lucero received payment for her work, including vegetables and food.

She served as a midwife until the age of 80 and, dying at the age of 104, she attributed her long life to her Catholic faith.

Legacy

Tucson's Kino Community Hospital named their labor and delivery unit after Lucero.

References

1892 births
1996 deaths
Pascua Yaqui people
American Roman Catholics
Mexican Roman Catholics
People from Tucson, Arizona
American midwives
Mexican emigrants to the United States
American centenarians
Mexican midwives
Women centenarians
Indigenous Mexican women
20th-century American women
20th-century American people
20th-century Native Americans
20th-century Native American women